Nokia Lumia 510 is a budget Windows Phone 7 smartphone developed by Nokia designed specifically for developing markets, such as China, India, Asia-Pacific and Latin America, running the Windows Phone 7.5 (later Windows Phone 7.8) operating system. Unveiled on 23 September 2012, it was released in November of the same year.

The phone shares the limitations of the Nokia Lumia 610, like not being able to run all Windows Phone applications and not being able to run all background tasks.

Phone Arena has criticized the lack of microSD slot for storage expansion given so little internal storage, the lack of camera flash, the lack of a front-facing camera, the low-resolution video capture and too little RAM memory (256 MB RAM) that makes the phone slow and prevents running some applications.

On 25 February 2013, the Nokia Lumia 520, the successor of the Nokia Lumia 510, was presented. The improvements are Windows Phone 8, dual-core 1 GHz Qualcomm S4 chipset, 512 MB of RAM, a better IPS panel display and support for up to 64 GB microSD cards.

Specifications

Hardware

The Lumia 505 has a 4.0-inch TFT capacitive display. It is powered by an 800 MHz Cortex-A5 Qualcomm Snapdragon S1 processor, 256 MB of RAM and 4 GB of internal storage. It has a 1300 mAh Li-Ion battery and a 5-megapixel rear camera. It is available in white, cyan, black, red and yellow.

Software

The Lumia 510 ships with Windows Phone 7.8.

See also
 Windows Phone
 Nokia Lumia 710
 Nokia Lumia 800
 Nokia Lumia 900

References

External links

 
 Lumia 510 technical specifications (at developer.nokia.com)

Lumia 510
Microsoft Lumia
Windows Phone devices
Mobile phones introduced in 2012
Discontinued smartphones
Videotelephony
Mobile phones with user-replaceable battery